Setzer's pygmy mouse (Mus setzeri) is a species of rodent in the family Muridae.
It is found in Botswana, Namibia, and Zambia.
Its natural habitats are dry savanna, rivers, freshwater lakes, and intermittent freshwater lakes.

References

Mus (rodent)
Mammals described in 1978
Taxonomy articles created by Polbot